Ariel Cohen is a political scientist focusing on political risk, international security and energy policy, and the rule of law. Cohen currently serves as the Director of the Energy, Growth, and Security Program (EGS) at the International Tax and Investment Center (ITIC). The International Tax and Investment Center (ITIC) is an independent, nonprofit research and education organization founded in 1993 to promote tax reform and public-private initiatives to improve the investment climate in transition and developing economies. He is also a nonresident senior fellow at the Atlantic Council within their Eurasia Center.  Until July 2014, Dr. Cohen was a senior research fellow at the Heritage Foundation in Washington, D.C.  He specializes in Russia/Eurasia, Eastern Europe, and the Middle East.

Early life and education
Cohen graduated Bar-Ilan University Law School in Israel in 1986 with L.L.B. In 1989 he received an M.A. in Law and Diplomacy and in 1993 a PhD. from The Fletcher School of Law and Diplomacy.

Political and media work
Cohen has testified before committees of the U.S. Congress, including the Senate and House Foreign Relations Committees, the House Armed Services Committee, the House Judiciary Committee and the Helsinki Commission. He also served as a Policy Adviser with the National Institute for Public Policy’s Center for Deterrence Analysis. In addition, Cohen has consulted for USAID, the World Bank and the Pentagon.

Cohen is a frequent writer and commentator in the American and international media. He has appeared on CNN, NBC, CBS, FOX, C-SPAN, BBC-TV and Al Jazeera English, as well as Russian and Ukrainian national TV networks. He was a commentator on a Voice of America weekly radio and TV show for eight years. Currently, he is a Contributing Editor to the National Interest and a blogger for Voice of America. He has written guest columns for The New York Times, International Herald Tribune, The Christian Science Monitor, The Washington Post, The Wall Street Journal, The Washington Times, EurasiaNet, Valdai Discussion Club, and National Review Online. In Europe, Cohen’s analyses have appeared in Kommersant, Izvestiya, Hurriyet, the popular Russian website Ezhenedelny Zhurnal, and many others.
 
Cohen has written on financial corruption and foreign policy in Russia, and on US security issues.

Select Bibliography

Books
The Russian Military and the Georgia War: Lessons and Implications 
(with Robert E. Hamilton and Strategic Studies Institute), (Military Bookshop, 2011) 

Kazakhstan: The Road to Independence 
(Central Asia Caucasus Institute, 2008, paperback) 

Kazakhstan: Energy Cooperation with Russia - Oil, Gas and Beyond
(GMB Publishing, 2006, paperback) 

Eurasia in Balance 
(Ashgate, 2005, hardcover), 

Russian Imperialism: Development and Crisis
(Praeger, 1996 – hardcover, 1998-paperback),

Essays
"Russian Missiles to Syria Endanger U.S. Foreign Policy Goals"
The Heritage Foundation
May 29, 2013

"How More Economic Freedom Will Attract Investment to Kazakhstan and Central Asia"
The Heritage Foundation
June 26, 2012

"Reset Regret: Heritage Foundation Recommendations" 
The Heritage Foundation
August 5, 2011

“Central Asian Terrorism: An Emerging Threat to U.S. Security” 
with Morgan Roach
The Heritage Foundation
June 13, 2011

“Turkey after the Elections: Implications for U.S. Foreign Policy” 
with Sally McNamara
The Heritage Foundation
June 8, 2011

Testimonies
"Time to Pause the Reset? Defending U.S. Interests in the Face of Russian Aggression", Foreign Affairs Committee, U.S. House of Representatives, July 7, 2011

"European and Eurasian Energy: Developing Capabilities for Security and Prosperity, Subcommittee on Europe and Eurasia", Foreign Affairs Committee, U.S. House of Representatives, June 2, 2011

"Foreign Policy and National Security Implications of Oil Dependence", Foreign Affairs Committee, U.S. House of Representatives, March 22, 2007

Current Appointments
 Member, Council on Foreign Relations
 Member, American Council on Germany

References

External links

 
Israeli political scientists
Living people
1959 births
People from Yalta
American political scientists
Soviet emigrants to Israel
Israeli emigrants to the United States